The 1992 NCAA Division I Women's Lacrosse Championship was the 11th annual single-elimination tournament to determine the national championship of Division I NCAA women's college lacrosse. The championship game was played at Goodman Stadium in Bethlehem, Pennsylvania during May 1992.  All NCAA Division I women's lacrosse programs were eligible for this championship; a total of 6 teams were invited to participate.

Maryland defeated Harvard, 11–10 (in overtime), to win their second national championship.

The leading scorers for the tournament, both with 7 goals, were Liz Berkery (Harvard) and Betsy Elder (Maryland). The Most Outstanding Player trophy was not awarded this year.

Teams

Tournament bracket

Tournament outstanding players 
Liz Berkery, Harvard
Ceci Clark, Harvard
Sarah Winters, Harvard
Betsy Elder, Maryland
Kerstin Manning, Maryland
Mandy Stevenson, Maryland

See also 
 NCAA Division I Women's Lacrosse Championship
 NCAA Division III Women's Lacrosse Championship
 1992 NCAA Division I Men's Lacrosse Championship

References

NCAA Division I Women's Lacrosse Championship
NCAA Division I Women's Lacrosse Championship
NCAA Women's Lacrosse Championship